Roger Carl Young, B.A., LL.B. (born March 7, 1941 in Niagara Falls, Ontario, Canada) is a Canadian former politician and lawyer. Only son of Carl Leslie Young (1914-2008) and Una Eileen Brown (1918-2012); three sisters: Wendy, Patti, Andrea. Educated at Stamford Collegiate, Ridley College, University of Toronto, Osgoode Hall law School (now York U.) and London School of Economics. Athletics: football, hockey, soccer, track & field, curling.

He was elected to the House of Commons of Canada as a Member of the Liberal Party in the 1974 election to the riding of Niagara Falls. He was Parliamentary Secretary to the Minister of Justice and Attorney General of Canada (1977–78) and Parliamentary Secretary to the Solicitor General of Canada (1978–79).

He also sat on various standing committees including the Standing Committee on Agriculture, Standing Committee on Broadcasting, Films and Assistance to the Arts, Standing Committee on Fisheries and Forestry, Standing Committee on Indian Affairs and Northern Development, Standing Committee on Labour, Manpower and Immigration and the Standing Committee on National Resources and Public Works.

Prior to being elected in 1974, he served as a Special Assistant and later Executive Assistant to the Hon. J J Greene, Minister of Energy, Mines and Resources, Canada (1968–70). Following his defeat in 1979, he served as Chief of Staff to the Hon. Yvon Pinard, President of the Queen's Privy Council for Canada and Government House Leader (1981–84). He then joined the Public Service Staff Relations Board as a Member/adjudicator of federal labour disputes between the Treasury Board and the major public service unions (1984-1991), following which he entered private practice as a consensual arbitrator, mediator and investigator of workplace harassment complaints. He has been more or less retired since 2009.

Throughout life, he has been a collector of art, antiques and various other forms of Canadiana, including vintage hunting decoys. For almost 35 years, he has gathered miniature model canoes of both world-wide Indigenous as well as factory origin. This resulted in writing and publishing a book - "Little things that matter; collecting antique factory sample canoes" - in April 2022 (ISBN 9781777928803). Roger Young's personal collection of rare, often one-of-a-kind, early North American 'display samples' has been on long-term loan to the Canadian Canoe Museum, Peterborough, Ontario, since 2017, where he also volunteers and assists.

External links 
 

1941 births
Canadian lawyers
Liberal Party of Canada MPs
Living people
Members of the House of Commons of Canada from Ontario
People from Niagara Falls, Ontario